Blake William Beavan (born January 17, 1989) is an American former professional baseball pitcher. A first-round draft pick in the 2007 MLB Draft by the Texas Rangers, Beavan was traded to the Seattle Mariners in 2010 in a package of prospects for Cliff Lee. In 2011, he made his Major League Baseball (MLB) debut with the Mariners.

Early life
Beavan began playing baseball at the age of 5 in the Irving Boys Baseball Association.

Career

Amateur career 
Beavan attended Irving High School in Irving, Texas. He was voted the district's freshman of the year in 2004. In 2006, his junior season, he led Irving to the playoffs for the first time since 1999. He had the lowest earned run average (ERA), 0.36, in Class 5A. That year, he played for the United States junior national baseball team and competed in the 2006 World Junior Baseball Championship. He also won Baseball Americas 2006 Youth Player of the Year award, as the United States won the silver medal.

In 2007, his senior season in high school, Beavan compiled a 9–2 win–loss record, a 0.19 ERA, and 139 strikeouts in 73 innings pitched, allowing only two earned runs in 11 starts. He threw a perfect game in March 2007. In recognition of his achievements, Beavan was named 2007 Texas high school player of the year. Beavan committed to attend Navarro College, a junior college in Corsicana, Texas, where he intended to play college baseball.

Texas Rangers
The Texas Rangers selected Beavan in the first round, with the 17th overall selection. He was one of three high school pitchers chosen by the Rangers in the first round of the draft. Beavan signed with the Rangers, foregoing college, for a signing bonus of $1.5 million. In his first professional season, Beavan had a 10–6 record and a 2.37 ERA in 23 games started for the Clinton LumberKings of the Class-A Midwest League. By 2009, Beavan pitched for the Bakersfield Blaze of the Class-A Advanced California League. He was promoted to the Frisco RoughRiders of the Class-AA Texas League in June 2009.

In 2010, Beavan had a 10–5 record and a 2.78 ERA in 17 games started at for Frisco, where he was named the Rangers' Minor League Pitcher of the Month for May. He received a promotion to the Oklahoma City RedHawks of the Class-AAA Pacific Coast League (PCL).

Seattle Mariners
Soon after the promotion, on July 9, 2010, Beavan was traded to the Seattle Mariners along with Justin Smoak and fellow prospects Matt Lawson and Josh Lueke for Cliff Lee and Mark Lowe. The Mariners assigned Beavan to the West Tenn Diamond Jaxx of the Class-AA Southern League.

Beavan started the 2011 season with the Tacoma Rainers of the Class-AAA PCL. He pitched to a 5–3 record and a 4.45 ERA with Tacoma. On July 2, 2011, the Mariners announced that Beavan would be making his Major League debut on July 3 against the San Diego Padres. The Seattle Mariners beat the Padres 3–1 with Beavan going 7 innings and giving up 1 earned run on 3 hits.

Beavan entered the 2012 season in contention for a spot in the Mariners' starting rotation. He won a spot in the rotation for Opening Day. Beavan threw a quality start opposing Philip Humber during Humber's perfect game on April 21, 2012.

On August 2, 2014, the Mariners outrighted Beavan off of the 40-man roster.

Arizona Diamondbacks
On December 4, 2014, the Arizona Diamondbacks signed Beavan to a minor league deal. He was released on July 13, 2015.

Bridgeport Bluefish
On May 18, 2016, Beavan signed with the Bridgeport Bluefish of the Atlantic League of Professional Baseball.

Pericos De Puebla
On March 10, 2017, Beavan signed with the Pericos de Puebla of the Liga Mexicana de Beisbol.

New York Mets
On May 4, 2017, Beavan signed with the New York Mets on a minor league deal and was assigned to Las Vegas 51s. He elected free agency on November 6, 2017.

Pitching style
Beavan threw five pitches. His primary pitch was a four-seam fastball at 90–93 mph, and he had a two-seam fastball with similar velocity that was used frequently against left-handed hitters (less so against righties). His main off-speed pitch was a curveball in the mid-to-upper 70s, although he also threw a changeup to lefties and a slider to righties (each in the low 80s).

Personal life / Post playing career

Beavan is the youngest of three children. His elder brothers are 13 and 11 years older than him. Both of his brothers played college baseball, but neither played professionally.

Beavan's wife, Allison, is a cyclist. The two rode together in an effort to help Beavan lose weight during the 2011–12 offseason.

As of 2019, Beaven was a youth baseball coach for Dallas Tigers WEST.

References

External links

1989 births
Living people
American expatriate baseball players in Mexico
Bakersfield Blaze players
Baseball players from Texas
Binghamton Rumble Ponies players
Bridgeport Bluefish players
Clinton LumberKings players
Frisco RoughRiders players
High Desert Mavericks players
Las Vegas 51s players
Major League Baseball pitchers
Mexican League baseball pitchers
People from Irving, Texas
Pericos de Puebla players
Reno Aces players
Seattle Mariners players
Tacoma Rainiers players
West Tennessee Diamond Jaxx players
Yaquis de Obregón players